The 2005 Allstate 400 at The Brickyard, the 12th running of the event, was a NASCAR Nextel Cup Series race held on August 7, 2005, at Indianapolis Motor Speedway in Speedway, Indiana. Contested at 160 laps on the 2.5 mile (4.023 km) speedway, it was the twenty-first race of the 2005 NASCAR Nextel Cup Series season. Tony Stewart of Joe Gibbs Racing won the race.

Background

The Indianapolis Motor Speedway, located in Speedway, Indiana, (an enclave suburb of Indianapolis) in the United States, is the home of the Indianapolis 500 and the Allstate 400 at the Brickyard. The track's turns are banked at 9 degrees, while the front stretch, the location of the finish line, has no banking. The back stretch, opposite of the front, also has a zero-degree banking. The racetrack has seats for more than 250,000 spectators.

Entry list

Practice

Practice 1 results

Qualifying 

Failed to qualify: Kevin Lepage (#37), Tony Raines (#92), Mike Garvey (#66), Stuart Kirby (#51), Mike Wallace (#4), P. J. Jones (#34), Morgan Shepherd (#89), Kenny Wallace (#00), Jimmy Spencer (#50)

*Had accident in qualifying

Race recap
A late race crash by Jimmie Johnson, combined with the win by Stewart, put him into the Nextel Cup points lead.  As part of the victory celebration, Tony Stewart went to turn two, where a fan handed him a can of Coca-Cola. Then upon returning to the frontstretch, Tony Stewart climbed the fence, along with the rest of his teammates. Kasey Kahne and Jeremy Mayfield finished 2nd and 4th for Evernham Motorsports. If Bill Elliott had finished in the top 10, all Evernham drivers would have finished in the top 10 for the first time that season.

Results

Race statistics
 Time of race: 3:22:03
 Average Speed: 
 Pole Speed: 184.117
 Cautions: 10 for 43 laps
 Margin of Victory: 0.794 sec
 Lead changes: 15
 Percent of race run under caution: 26.9%         
 Average green flag run: 10.6 laps

References

Allstate 400
Allstate 400
NASCAR races at Indianapolis Motor Speedway